Sergio Casal and Emilio Sánchez were the defending champions but did not participate this year.

Kelly Evernden and Johan Kriek won the title, defeating Kevin Curren and Danie Visser 7–6, 6–3 in the final.

Seeds
All seeds receive a bye into the second round.

Draw

Finals

Top half

Bottom half

References
Draw

U.S. Pro Indoor
1988 Grand Prix (tennis)